John William Park (born 14 September 1973) is a former Scottish Labour Party politician.  He was elected as a Member of the Scottish Parliament (MSP) for the Mid Scotland and Fife electoral region in May 2007. Park was re-elected in 2011, but resigned his seat with effect from 7 December 2012 and was succeeded by Jayne Baxter.

Background

Park was formerly a trade union official working for Unite (formerly Amicus and the Amalgamated Engineering and Electrical Union) and the Scottish TUC. He started working in Rosyth Dockyard in 1989 as an electrical apprentice. He became active in the Dockyard's influential trade unions during the Trident refitting campaign in the early 1990s. After becoming a shop steward he was elected the Dockyard's youngest ever full-time trade union convenor in 1998.

Member of the Scottish Parliament
Park was appointed the Labour Party's Skills spokesperson following the election of Wendy Alexander as leader in September 2007 and quickly established a campaign to increase the number of apprentices in Scotland. He was appointed in September 2008 to Iain Gray's Shadow Cabinet as the Shadow Minister for Economy and Skills. 

Park resigned his seat on 7 December 2012, to take up a position with the Community trades union. He was replaced by the next available Labour candidate from the Mid Scotland and Fife list, Fife Councillor Jayne Baxter (Cowdenbeath).

References

External links 
 
 John Park profile at Scottish Labour website 
 Park's constituency website

1973 births
Living people
Politicians from Dunfermline
Labour MSPs
Members of the Scottish Parliament 2007–2011
Members of the Scottish Parliament 2011–2016
Scottish trade unionists